Aleksandr Sergeyevich Ivanchenkov (born 28 September 1940 ) is a retired Soviet cosmonaut who flew as Flight Engineer on Soyuz 29 and Soyuz T-6, he spent 147 days, 12 hours and 37 minutes in space.

Biography 
Ivanchenkov is married with one child.  He was selected as a cosmonaut on 27 March 1973. He retired on 3 November 1993.

Honours and awards
Twice Hero of the Soviet Union;
Pilot-Cosmonaut of the USSR;
Two Orders of Lenin;
Medal "For Merit in Space Exploration" (Russian Federation);
Hero of the German Democratic Republic;
Order of Karl Marx;
Commander of the Legion of Honour (France);
Cross of Grunwald 3rd class.

See also
Spaceflight records

External links
http://www.spacefacts.de/bios/cosmonauts/english/ivanchenkov_aleksandr.htm
 The official website of the city administration Baikonur - Honorary citizens of Baikonur

1940 births
Living people
People from Ivanteyevka
Soviet cosmonauts
Heroes of the Soviet Union
Soviet engineers
Salyut program cosmonauts
Spacewalkers